Pádraig Ó Céidigh (born 1 February 1957) is an Irish former Independent politician and businessman who served as a Senator from 2016 to 2020, after being nominated by the Taoiseach. He is the former owner of Aer Arann Islands

He gained a B.Comm. from University College Galway in 1978. He worked as an accountant and then as a teacher at Coláiste Iognáid, went on to study law and began practicing with his own firm in the city.

He ran unsuccessfully for one of the three Seanad seats allocated to the National University of Ireland, losing on transfers despite being third on first preferences, but was nominated to the 25th Seanad by Taoiseach Enda Kenny on 11 May 2016.

Ó Céidigh served as a member of the Governing Board of the Irish state broadcaster RTÉ prior to his appointment to the Seanad.

In March 2018, he announced his intention to stand in the 2018 presidential election against incumbent President Michael D. Higgins, as an Independent candidate, but subsequently did not stand in the election.

References

1957 births
Living people
Alumni of the University of Galway
Independent members of Seanad Éireann
Irish accountants
Irish businesspeople
Irish schoolteachers
Members of the 25th Seanad
Nominated members of Seanad Éireann
People from County Galway
20th-century Irish people